Bigelow Methodist Episcopal Church, South is a historic church west of the junction of Volman and Emma Streets in Bigelow, Arkansas.  It is a single-story wood-frame structure with a gabled roof and weatherboard siding.  It has a slightly project entry vestibule, with a double-door entry topped by a single-pane square window.  Above this a flared roof section transitions to a square tower, which straddles across the end of the main roof and is topped by a gabled roof.  The eaves of all roofs show exposed rafter ends in the Craftsman style.  It was built about 1908, at a time when the small town was undergoing a boom due to the lumber industry.  The church is one of the few surviving buildings from that period.

The building was listed on the National Register of Historic Places in 1996.

See also
National Register of Historic Places listings in Perry County, Arkansas

References

Methodist churches in Arkansas
Churches on the National Register of Historic Places in Arkansas
Churches completed in 1908
Churches in Perry County, Arkansas
National Register of Historic Places in Perry County, Arkansas
1908 establishments in Arkansas
American Craftsman architecture in Arkansas